The Casa de la Panadería is a municipal and cultural building on the north side of the Plaza Mayor in Madrid. It is four stories high, the ground floor comprising porticos and the top floor in the form of an attic, with its sides crowned by angular towers.

History

The Casa de la Panadería (Bakery House) was erected during the construction of the Plaza Mayor. Juan Gómez de Mora was in charge of its construction, which was completed in 1619. After the second burning of the plaza in 1672, the building was rebuilt in seventeen months by Tomás Román, who commissioned painters Claudio Coello and José Jiménez Donoso to decorate the interior and the frescoes on the facade. After the third burning of the plaza in 1790, the surviving Casa de la Panadería served as a reference for Juan de Villanueva's reconstruction of the rest of the plaza.

La Casa de la Panadería has suffered several remodelings since then, most notably that carried out by Joaquín María de la Vega in 1880.

In 1988, the Madrid City Council convened a public contest to undertake the decorating of the facade, due to the severe deterioration of the paintings done by painter and ceramicist Enrique Guijo in 1914. The artists Guillermo Pérez Villalta, Sigfrido Martín Begué, and Carlos Franco were invited to participate in the contest. Carlos Franco won with a design based on mythological figures such as Cybele, Proserpine, Bacchus, and Cupid, as well as others invented by the artist, interwoven into the history of Madrid and the Plaza Mayor. The work to paint Carlos Franco's frescoes was carried out in 1992.

Uses

In the beginning, its lower levels housed the main bakery of the town. From 1732 on, it served as offices for the Peso Real and the Fiel Contraste. Between 1745 and 1774, the Real Academia de Bellas Artes de San Fernando (Royal Academy of Fine Arts of San Fernando) kept its headquarters there, as did the Real Academia de la Historia (Royal Academy of History) from 1774 to 1871. At the end of the 19th century, the Madrid City Council took charge of La Casa de la Panadería, converting it into the second Casa Consistorial de la Villa. Later on, it became the headquarters of the Municipal Library and Municipal Archives. Still later, it housed various municipal offices as well as institutions like the Centro Cultural Mesonero Romanos. Today its premises are occupied by the Madrid Tourist Board and the ground floor houses the Madrid Tourism Center.

Characteristics

Commemorative plaques

Spanish coat of arms

Found at the top center of La Casa de la Panadería are the royal Spanish arms from the reign of Carlos II. Note that the arms of Portugal are missing, as Portugal had recently regained its independence from Spanish rule.

This shield is composed of the arms of Castile and León in the first quarter, the arms of Aragón and Sicily in the second, the arms of Austria and Burgundy modern in the third, and the arms of Burgundy ancient and Brabant in the fourth. The arms of Flanders and Tyrol are found in the lower escutcheon on the nombril point, and the symbol for Granada in the center of the shield. The arms of Portugal would have been situated in an escutcheon on the honor point, between those of Castile and León and those of Aragón.

See also
Plaza Mayor, Madrid

Buildings and structures in Sol neighborhood, Madrid